The UAE and Yemen have a complex and strained relationship, as the UAE has played a significant role in regional politics in Yemen, and has at various points been an adversary of the country, as the UAE's involvement in Yemen, for example the United Arab Emirates takeover of Socotra, and its support for the Southern Transitional Council, a secessionist organization in Southern Yemen, has been a source of tension between the two countries, and has contributed to the ongoing conflict and humanitarian crisis in the country. Furthermore, the UAE has been involved in other efforts in Yemen that have been controversial. The country has been accused of backing local militias and separatist groups that have sought to gain more autonomy or independence from the central government. Some critics have accused the UAE of using these groups to further its own interests in the region, rather than working towards a broader peace and stability in Yemen.

History 
The diplomatic relations between the UAE and Yemen started in 1971, Zayed bin Sultan Al Nahyan have made four official visits to Yemen, first on November 21, 1972, fourth on December 21, 1986, when the Ma'rib Dam, which was rebuilt at the expense of the UAE, was opened.

Alongside the Federal Republic of Germany, the UAE chairs the Task Force on Economics and Good Governance in the Friends of Yemen International Group that was formed during the London 2010 conference to support development in Yemen. The Emirates Red Crescent Authority opened an office in the capital, Sanaa, in 1996 .

The two countries agreed to form the UAE-Yemeni Joint Ministerial Committee in 1995 under the chairmanship of the two foreign ministers. The committee held the session of its first meeting in the Yemeni capital, Sana'a, on February 12, 2001, and the committee held its second meeting in Abu Dhabi during the period December 14–16, 2009.

The Yemeni Civil War
The UAE joined the Saudi-led intervention in Yemen in support for the Hadi Government of Yemen. 
On April 30, 2018, UAE took administrative control of Socotra island from Yemen. 
Two weeks later on 14 May, Saudi troops were also deployed to the archipelago and a deal was brokered between the United Arab Emirates Armed Forces and Yemen's forces for a joint military training exercise and the return of administrative control of Socotra's airport and seaport to Yemen. The relations were strained for a while after the United Arab Emirates takeover of Socotra.

See also
 Foreign relations of the United Arab Emirates
 Foreign relations of Yemen
 United Arab Emirates takeover of Socotra

References

 
Yemen
Bilateral relations of Yemen